Old Stone Tavern, also known as Rock House, is a historic inn and tavern located near Atkins, Smyth County, Virginia. It was built by Frederick Cullop before 1815, and is a two-story, three bay, limestone structure with a central-hall plan. A frame rear ell was added in the mid-19th century. It has a side gable roof.  The front facade features a mid-19th century porch supported by chamfered columns connected on each level by a decorative cyma frieze and sawn balustrade.  The tavern was built to accommodate travelers in the heavy migration through Cumberland Gap to the west in the early 19th century.

It received Virginia Landmark status in 1981 (VLR Listing Date 03/17/1981)–– and was listed on the National Register of Historic Places in 1982.

References

Drinking establishments on the National Register of Historic Places in Virginia
Commercial buildings completed in 1815
Buildings and structures in Smyth County, Virginia
National Register of Historic Places in Smyth County, Virginia